Imperium is the sixth studio album by Polish heavy metal band Hunter. It was released on November 15, 2013 by Tune Project/Fonografika.

A music video was shot for the song "Imperium uboju" which was directed by Mateusz Winkiel.

The album landed at number 1 on Polish Albums Chart, and dropped out three weeks later. On May 14, 2014 Imperium was certified Gold in Poland for selling 15,000 copies.

Track listing

Credits

References 

2013 albums
Hunter (band) albums
Polish-language albums